Martín Hernán Rodríguez Ducaud (born 26 March 1990) is a Chilean field hockey player.

Career

Junior national team
In 2008, Rodríguez debuted for the Chile U–21 team at the Pan American Junior Championship in Port of Spain, winning a silver medal.

After qualifying for the 2009 FIH Junior World Cup, Rodríguez again represented the junior national team at the tournament.

Los Diablos
Rodríguez made his senior international debut in 2008, at the South American Championship in Montevideo.

Since his debut, Rodríguez has been a constant fixture in the Los Diablos team.

During his career, Rodríguez has medalled twice at the Pan American Games, winning bronze at both the 2011 and 2015 games, in Guadalajara and Toronto respectively. He also won silver at the 2014 and 2018 South American Games, in Santiago and Cochabamba respectively.

In 2019, he represented Chile at the Pan American Games in Lima and the 2018–19 FIH Series Finals in Le Touquet.

References

External links

1990 births
Living people
Chilean male field hockey players
South American Games medalists in field hockey
South American Games silver medalists for Chile
Pan American Games medalists in field hockey
Pan American Games bronze medalists for Chile
Sportspeople from Santiago
Medalists at the 2011 Pan American Games
Medalists at the 2015 Pan American Games
Field hockey players at the 2011 Pan American Games
Field hockey players at the 2015 Pan American Games
Field hockey players at the 2019 Pan American Games
Competitors at the 2014 South American Games
Competitors at the 2018 South American Games
Competitors at the 2022 South American Games
2023 Men's FIH Hockey World Cup players
21st-century Chilean people